Bu Yunchaokete (born 19 January 2002) is a Chinese tennis player.

He has a career high ATP singles ranking of No. 270, achieved on 13 February 2023. He also has a career high ATP doubles ranking of 462 achieved on 3 October 2022.

He represents China at the Davis Cup, where he has a W/L record of 0–2.

Challenger and World Tennis Tour Finals

Singles: 8 (6-2)

References

External links

2002 births
Living people
Chinese male tennis players
Sportspeople from Hangzhou
21st-century Chinese people